Renzo Soldani (2 May 1925 – 2 January 2013) was an Italian racing cyclist. He won the 1950 edition of the Giro di Lombardia.

References

External links
 

1925 births
2013 deaths
Italian male cyclists
People from Pistoia
Sportspeople from the Province of Pistoia
Cyclists from Tuscany